Küresünni is a Turkic tribe that inhabits the territory of Salmas County, Urmia County,  Khoy County,  Maku County in Iran and Van Province in Turkey. It is believed that they descend from Chepni tribesmen who were settled in the region by the Ottoman Empire to serve against the Qizilbash. Küresünni, from the Shafi'i madh'hab, continue to be fervent Sunnis. In the southwest of Khoy, there are Kurdicized groups of Küresünni Turks.

Following their conflict with Kurdish leader Simko Shikak in 1921, a group of Küresünni took refuge in Van Province of Turkey.

Etymology
The term Küresünni is thought to have originated as an exonym used by Kurds and Shiites in Iran meaning donkey Sunni. Despite being an ethnic slur, this exonym became the name of the group, as most Küresünni tribesmen didn't know its meaning.

See also
Giresun
Küre Mountains

References

External links
Küresünniler Küresünni social web community

Ethnic groups in Iran
Ethnic groups in Turkey
Azerbaijani tribes
Turkoman tribes
Chepni people
Ethnic groups in the Middle East